It's You and Me: A New Day is the television soundtrack for series three of the children's television show of the same name, based on the 1978 film Grease. It is sung by actress and singer Sheryl Rubio and features six tracks. The album was first released on September 2, 2009 by Universal Music.

Track listing

Latin American edition

References 

2009 soundtrack albums
Television soundtracks